Lipoma HMGIC fusion partner-like 1 protein is a protein that in humans is encoded by the LHFPL1 gene.

This gene is a member of the lipoma HMGIC fusion partner (LHFP) gene family, which is a subset of the superfamily of tetraspan transmembrane protein encoding genes. Mutations in one LHFP-like gene result in deafness in humans and mice, and a second LHFP-like gene is fused to a high-mobility group gene in a translocation-associated lipoma. Alternatively spliced transcript variants have been found, but their biological validity has not been determined.

References

Further reading